Victoria Montesi is a fictional character appearing in American comic books published by Marvel Comics. Created by writer/editor Christian Cooper, she first appeared in The Darkhold #1 (October 1992), and is notable for being the first openly lesbian character to appear in Marvel Comics.

Publication history 
Victoria Montesi first appeared in The Darkhold #1 (October 1992). Created by writer and editor Christian Cooper, she was the first openly lesbian character to appear in Marvel Comics.

Fictional character biography
Montesi is the only child of Monsignor Vittorio Montesi; the Montesi line was long ago designated as the guardians of the Darkhold, a tome of ancient black magic which has the potential to summon the Elder God Chthon to wreak havoc upon the Earth, but Victoria, half-American, disbelieves her father's claims and takes up hospital work in Rome, where she lives with her lover, karate instructor Natasha "Nash" Salvato.

However, when pages from the Darkhold are distributed to unsuspecting mortals by a demonic Dwarf and Nash is rendered quadriplegic and comatose following an explosion intended to kill Victoria, she joins with occult expert Louise Hastings and Interpol agent Sam Buchanan to recover the pages as the Darkhold Redeemers.

Midnight Sons
In Darkhold #1, Montesi, Hastings and Buchanan began working with the Ghost Rider and Johnny Blaze when they discovered Lilith, an ancient demonic entity, had sought Montesi's death. Thereafter, the group was loosely affiliated with Doctor Strange, Ghost Rider, the Nightstalkers, and the other "Midnight Sons".

These alliances draw them into many adventures unrelated to the hunt for Darkhold pages. Their involvement with the forces of darkness had been predicted long ago as part of the 'nine', a group of heroes destined to destroy much evil. Killing one of the group would mean much success for the forces of darkness, even against the eight survivors. In once incident, Victoria and Sam become involved in Lilith's rebirth from the haunted grounds of the Salem Fields Cemetery in Cypress Hills, Brooklyn. A mist seeping from the ground is bringing with it demonic creatures of all sorts. Sam, Victoria, Ghost Rider, Caretaker, the Nightstalkers and other heroes try to their best to stop it but end up on the run and under siege in the storyline appropriately known as Siege of Darkness.

The group, as a trio, hunts down the Darkhold pages whenever they can. In Hawaii, they fight demonic soldiers brought forth from the mind of a Pearl Harbor survivor. In a small mountain town, Victoria helps protect a school full of children from rampaging demonic creatures. She and Sam are assisted by Sabretooth.

In short order, Victoria deals with the apparent betrayal of Sam and the sacrifice of Louise Hastings, who perishes soon after giving her soul to bring to life many of the Midnight Sons, including Victoria herself.

Louise's place in the group is filled by her grandson Jinx, who has the magical ability to nudge luck into his favor. He develops a childish crush on Victoria, but still ends up a trusted ally. She takes him on a trip to New York to hunt down a page, which ultimately leads to a confrontation with Spider-Man, the Paralyzer and Zzzax.

Victoria ultimately becomes entranced by the pages of the Darkhold as the demonic dwarf offers her the chance to restore the vitality and movement of Nash. As with all Darkhold incidents, this becomes corrupted as innocent people are killed in order to steal their vitality. Nash, through her bond with Victoria, convinces her to neutralize the Darkhold spell.

Doctor Strange
After some months of such adventures, Victoria's life takes an even worse turn when it is revealed that she is in fact Chthon's daughter, created when the sterile Vittorio used magic to guarantee himself an heir, and she is mystically impregnated with Chthon himself; Sorcerer Supreme Doctor Strange kept Victoria in mystic stasis for a time to delay Chthon's rebirth into the Earth dimension, and he was ultimately able to prevent it. When last seen, Victoria was being spirited away by the Midwife, a creation of Chthon's who nevertheless rebelled against her master's rebirth and sought to help Victoria recover from her ordeal.

The FBI later recruits Victoria to help them track Carnage, who had absconded to the Indian Ocean with the Darkhold.

Powers and abilities
Victoria Montesi can sense when someone has accessed a page from the Darkhold tome. Originally thought to be due to her Montesi family bloodline, Victoria's powers were actually due to her creation through the magic of the Darkhold by her sterile father, Vittorio Montesi. She is also a trained doctor and has limited martial arts training taught to her by her lover, Nash Salvato, and later by her teammate, Sam Buchanan.

References

External links 
 

Marvel Comics female characters
Comics characters introduced in 1992
Fictional lesbians
Marvel Comics LGBT characters
Marvel Comics characters who use magic